This is a list of rivers of Thailand. The rivers are arranged alphabetically within their respective provinces or special governed districts. The same river may be found in more than one province as many rivers cross province borders.

Provinces

Ang Thong
 Chao Phraya River

Ayutthaya
 Chao Phraya River
 Lop Buri River
 Noi River
 Pa Sak River

Bueng Kan
 Mekong River

Buriram
 Mun River
 Lam Takhong River

Chachoengsao
 Bang Pakong River
 Nakhon Nayok River

Chainat
 Chao Phraya River
 Sakae Krang River
 Tha Chin River

Chaiyaphum
 Chi River

Chanthaburi
 Chanthaburi River

Chiang Mai
 Kok River
 Li River
 Ping River

Chiang Rai
 Ing River
 Kok River
 Mae Sai River
 Mekong River
 Ruak River
 Wang River
 Yom River

Kalasin
 Chi River

Kamphaeng Phet
 Ping River
 Sakae Krang River

Kanchanaburi
 Khwae Yai River
 Mae Klong River
 Phachi River

Lampang
 Wang River

Lamphun
 Li River
 Ping River

Loei
 Hueang River
 Loei River
 Mekong River
 Pa Sak River

Lop Buri
 Pa Sak River

Mae Hong Son
 Moei River
 Pai River
 Salween River

Maha Sarakham
 Chi River

Nakhon Pathom
 Mae Klong River
 Tha Chin River

Nakhon Phanom
 Mekong River

Nakhon Ratchasima
 Mun River

Nakhon Sawan
 Chao Phraya River
 Nan River
 Ping River
 Sakae Krang River
 Yom River

Nakhon Si Thammarat
 Tapi River
 Trang River
 Pakphanang River

Nan
 Nan River
 Wa River

Nong Khai
 Mekong River

Nonthaburi
 Chao Phraya River

Mukdahan
 Mekong River

Pattani
 Pattani River

Phayao
 Ing River
 Yom River

Phetchabun
 Pa Sak River

Phetchaburi
 Phetchaburi River

Phichit
 Nan River
 Yom River

Phitsanulok
 Nan River
 Yom River

Phrae
 Yom River

Prachinburi
 Bang Pakong River

Ratchaburi
 Mae Klong River
 Phachi River

Samut Sakhon
 Tha Chin River

Saraburi
 Lop Buri River
 Pa Sak River

Sisaket
 Mun River

Suphan Buri
 Tha Chin River

Tak
 Khwae Yai River
 Mae Klong River
 Ping River
 Wang River

Trang
 Trang River

Ubon Ratchathani
 Chi River
 Mekong River
 Mun River

Uttaradit
 Nan River

Yala
 Pattani River

Special governed districts

Bangkok
 Chao Phraya River

 
Thailand
Rivers